The Jason Collier Sportsmanship Award is an annual NBA G League award given since the league's inaugural National Basketball Developmental League season. The award honors the player who best represents the ideals of character and conduct on and off the court. The league's head coaches determine the award by voting and it is usually presented to the honoree during the G League playoffs. The award is named after former D-League, Houston Rockets and Atlanta Hawks center Jason Collier, who died on October 15, 2005. Collier was a player and person who exemplified the qualities of a faithful teammate, husband, father, son, brother and friend. He was ready to begin his sixth NBA season at the time of his death. Billy Thomas and Ron Howard have both won the award on two occasions.

Winners

See also
NBA Sportsmanship Award

References

National Basketball Association lists
Sportmanship
Awards established in 2002
2002 establishments in the United States
Sportsmanship trophies and awards